Amirah Iman Ali (born December 7, 1998) is an American soccer forward and midfielder who plays for San Diego Wave FC of the National Women's Soccer League. She previously played for the Rutgers Scarlet Knights women's soccer team.

Youth career 

Ali, born in Voorhees Twp., raised in [Winslow Township, New Jersey], played youth soccer for the Winslow Tigers, a New Jersey-based travel team coached by Rich King, father of NWSL player Tziarra King. Along with 11v11 play Amirah was an exceptional youth soccer player in 3v3 & Futsal soccer formats where she & Tziarra King along with their Winslow Tigers squad share many tournament wins and individual accolades.   Ali’s later youth years she joined Players Development Academy of the Elite Clubs National League prior to going to Rutgers University. 

Ali played high school soccer for Eastern Regional High School in her high school town of Voorhees Township, New Jersey, where she was named High School Girls' Player of the Year by both the National Soccer Coaches Association of America, the Courier-Post, and the United Soccer Coaches organization. She finished her high school career with 99 goals and 51 assists.

College career 

Ali played for the Rutgers Scarlet Knights from 2017 to 2021, primarily as a forward or attacking midfielder. The Scarlet Knights won its first-ever Big Ten Conference championship in 2021 with Ali on the squad, and Ali was on the shortlist for the MAC Hermann Trophy in 2019, 2020, and 2021.

Portland Thorns FC drafted Ali with the 22nd-overall pick in the 2021 NWSL Draft, despite her decision not to declare for the draft. Portland Thorns FC coach Mark Parsons suggested Ali was capable of playing immediately for an NWSL club. She instead returned to Rutgers to complete her collegiate career, leading Rutgers to the 2021 NCAA Division I Women's Soccer Tournament — the program's first appearance since 2015 — and the Scarlet Knights finished as semi-finalists.

Ali finished her Rutgers career with 44 goals, 17 of them match-winners, and 19 assists. She scored 9 career golden goals, a Rutgers record, and played 6,309 minutes across 103 matches, 102 of them as a starter. Amirah Ali finished her career at Rutgers Women’s Soccer program as the only female soccer athlete as a Four Time All American.  She was team captain in 2019, 2020, and 2021.

Club career

San Diego Wave FC 

Portland Thorns traded NWSL player rights to Ali, as well as signed defender Christen Westphal, to San Diego Wave FC in exchange for $50,000 in allocation money on December 16, 2021. She scored her first professional goal on April 2, 2022, during the 2022 NWSL Challenge Cup against Angel City FC.

International career 

Ali played for the U19 United States women's national soccer team, and was invited to U14, U18, and U19 camps.

Honors

Rutgers Scarlet Knights 

 All-Big Ten Team (third team 2017; first team 2018, 2019, 2020, 2021)
 All-American Team (second team 2018; first team 2019, 2020; third team 2021)
 NCAA College Cup All-Tournament Team (2021)
 MAC Hermann Trophy candidate (2021) and semi-finalist (2020)

References

External links 

 San Diego Wave FC profile
 NWSL profile
 Rutgers profile
 
 
 

1998 births
Living people
Eastern Regional High School alumni
People from Voorhees Township, New Jersey
American women's soccer players
Soccer players from New Jersey
Sportspeople from Camden County, New Jersey
Women's association football midfielders
Women's association football forwards
Rutgers Scarlet Knights women's soccer players
National Women's Soccer League players
San Diego Wave FC players